Ławica may refer to the following places in Poland:
Poznań-Ławica Airport  in the city of Poznań in western Poland
Ławica, Poznań part of the Grunwald district of Poznań
Ławica, Międzychód County (west-central Poland)
Ławica, Lower Silesian Voivodeship (south-west Poland)